True Trans is an acoustic EP by American punk rock band Against Me!. The band released it as a digital single on July 12, 2013 through their label, Total Treble Music. The two songs on the EP were made available via an email download link to those who preordered tickets for Laura Jane Grace's August 2013 tour of the U.S. East Coast. It was later distributed as a 7".

The EP was released for free, for a limited time, on Against Me!'s website on July 15, 2013.

Background
The EP features acoustic versions of two songs from the band's sixth studio album, Transgender Dysphoria Blues, which was released in early 2014. The song "True Trans Soul Rebel" has been played at live shows since May 30, 2012.

The album cover depicts Jame "Buffalo Bill" Gumb from the 1991 film The Silence of the Lambs, who is a male serial killer often wrongly described as transgender.

Track listing

Personnel
 Laura Jane Grace – guitar, vocals

Art and design
 Steak Mtn. – art direction, design, typography, and illustration

See also
Against Me! discography

References

2013 singles
2013 songs
Against Me! songs
Transgender-related songs
Songs written by Laura Jane Grace